The 1990 United States Senate election in Virginia took place on November 5, 1990. Incumbent Republican U.S. Senator John W. Warner won re-election to a third term. No Democrat filed to run against him as he won every single county and city in the state with over 60% of the vote. Independent Nancy B. Spannaus (an affiliate of the controversial Lyndon LaRouche) got 18% of the vote, as she was the only other candidate on the ballot besides Warner.

Results

See also 
 1990 United States Senate elections

References 

1990 Virginia elections
Virginia
1990